William Simmons may refer to:

 William Henry Simmons (1811–1882), English mezzotint engraver
 William Benjamin Dearborn Simmons (1823–1876), American organ builder
 William A. Simmons (1840–1916), American government official
 William J. Simmons (teacher) (1849–1890), American ex-slave and college president
 William Simmons (politician) (1865–1956), Canadian politician
 William Joseph Simmons (1880–1945), American founder of the second Ku Klux Klan
 William Simmons (athlete) (1903–?), English athlete
 William W. Simmons (executive) (1912–1997), American IBM executive
 William J. Simmons, see List of World War II aces from the United States
 William W. Simmons (physicist) (born 1932), American physicist
 William Simmons (anthropologist) (1938–2018), American anthropologist
 William Mark Simmons (born 1953), American fantasy and horror novelist
 William T. Simmons, United States Army officer and Medal of Honor recipient
 Bill "El Wingador" Simmons (born 1961), American competitive eater
 Bill Simmons (born 1969), American sports columnist

See also
 William S. Simmons Plantation, a historic house in Cave Spring, Georgia, United States
 Billy Simmonds (born 1980), Australian entrepreneur, martial artist, and bodybuilder
 Willie Simmons (disambiguation)